The 2011–12 Boston College Eagles men's ice hockey team represented Boston College in the 2011–12 NCAA Division I men's ice hockey season. The team was coached by Jerry York, '67, his eighteenth season behind the bench at Boston College.  The Eagles played their home games at Kelley Rink on the campus of Boston College, competing in Hockey East.

Offseason
March 27, 2011: Junior forward Cam Atkinson signed with the Columbus Blue Jackets, forgoing his senior season.

March 30, 2011: Junior forward Jimmy Hayes signed with the Chicago Blackhawks, also forgoing his senior season.

April 11, 2011: Sophomores Brian Dumoulin and Chris Kreider announced that they would return to Boston College for the 2011–12 season.

April 13, 2011: Sophomore defenseman Philip Samuelsson decided to forgo his final two seasons with Boston College to pursue a pro career in the Pittsburgh Penguins organization.

Also, sophomore forward Chris Kreider was selected to the United States national team that competed at the 2011 IIHF World Championship in Slovakia.

Season
Boston College defeated Ferris State 4–1 in the 2012 Frozen Four championship game, earning the school's fifth national title and third title in five years.  It was Jerry York's fourth title as head coach of the Eagles, having also won in 2001, 2008, and 2010.  BC entered the NCAA tournament as the number one overall seed, defeating Air Force and defending national champion Minnesota Duluth in the Northeast Regional in Worcester to advance to the Frozen Four at the Tampa Bay Times Forum in Tampa.  The Eagles defeated Minnesota 6–1 in the semifinals before beating Ferris State in the national title game, with goaltender Parker Milner earning Most Outstanding Player honors.

Boston College also entered the 2011–2012 season as reigning Hockey East tournament champions, having defeated Merrimack 5–3 in the championship game, as well as defending Beanpot champions, beating Northeastern in the final 7–6 in overtime.  The Eagles also won the 2010–11 Hockey East regular season championship, their first since 2004–05.

The Eagles defended their Beanpot title and won their third in a row by defeating Boston University 3–2 on a goal by sophomore forward Bill Arnold in the last seconds of the first overtime period.  It was the Eagles seventeenth Beanpot title.  The Eagles also defended their Hockey East regular season championship, clinching their record twelfth title in school history on March 3, 2012 by defeating Vermont 4–0 at Kelley Rink.  BC won their third Hockey East Tournament championship in a row, the first three-peat in the history of the conference, and record eleventh title all-time, by defeating Maine 4–1 in the championship game in Boston.

Boston College also participated in two additional in-season tournaments, the Ice Breaker in Grand Forks, ND and the Great Lakes Invitational in Detroit, MI. BC won the 2011 Ice Breaker Tournament by defeating Michigan State 5–2 in the first round, and then beating North Dakota in the championship game, 6–2.  In the first round of the 2011 Great Lakes Invitational, BC fell to Michigan 4–2 before defeating Michigan Tech 2–1 in the consolation game.

On November 3, 2011, it was announced that the Eagles will play Northeastern at Fenway Park on January 14, 2012 in Hockey East play.  The contest was part of a double-header, with a game between MIAA-rivals Boston College High School and Catholic Memorial slated for earlier in the day.  BC defeated Northeastern 2–1.

On February 17, 2012, head coach Jerry York won his 900th career game when the Eagles defeated Merrimack 4–2 at Kelley Rink.  York is only the second college hockey coach to achieve 900 wins, with Ron Mason being the first.  York ended the season with 913, which placed him second all-time in career victories after Ron Mason, who has 924.

Departures
 Brian Gibbons, F – Graduation
 Joe Whitney, F – Graduation
 John Muse, G – Graduation
 Cam Atkinson, F – signed with Columbus Blue Jackets
 Jimmy Hayes, F – signed with Chicago Blackhawks
 Philip Samuelsson, D – signed with Pittsburgh Penguins

Recruiting
Boston College adds nine freshmen for the 2011–2012 season: two goaltenders in Brian Billet and Brad Barone, both alumni of the EJHL; two recruits from Canada in Mark Begert, a defenseman, and Destry Straight, a forward, who were teammates with the Coquitlam Express of the BCHL; forward Danny Linell, a Long Island native and 2011–12 recipient of the Hugh and Doris MacIsaac Family Scholarship Fund; forward Johnny Gaudreau, a fourth round pick of the Calgary Flames in the 2011 NHL Entry Draft who was previously committed to play at Northeastern; Hingham-native Cam Spiro, who was also an All-American lacrosse player at Tabor Academy; forward Michael Sit, a Minnesota native who joins the Eagles from powerhouse Edina; and forward Quinn Smith, who played for the Youngstown Phantoms in the USHL.

Roster

Standings
On September 27, 2011, BC was picked to finish first in the preseason Hockey East coaches poll.

Schedule and results

|-
!colspan=12 ! style=""; | 

|-
!colspan=12 ! style=""; | Regular Season

|-
!colspan=12 ! style=""; | 

|-
!colspan=12 ! style=""; | 

|-
!colspan=12 style=";" | 

|-
!colspan=12 style=";" |

Statistics

Skaters

Goaltenders

Rankings

Note: USCHO did not release a poll in week 24.

Awards and honors

Conference, National, and Tournament Awards

2011 Ice Breaker MVP
Chris Kreider, F 

2011 Ice Breaker All-Tournament Team
Parker Milner, G
Tommy Cross, D
Patch Alber, D
Chris Kreider, F
Bill Arnold, F

2012 NCAA Tournament Most Outstanding Player
Parker Milner, G

2012 NCAA Frozen Four All-Tournament Team
Parker Milner, G
Brian Dumoulin, D
Steven Whitney, F
Paul Carey, F

2011–12 AHCA All-Americans
Brian Dumoulin, D (First Team)
Barry Almeida, F (Second Team)

2012 All-USCHO
Brian Dumoulin, D (First Team)
Barry Almeida, F (Second Team)
Parker Milner, G (Third Team)
Tommy Cross, D (Third Team)

2012 USCHO Rookie of the Year
Johnny Gaudreau, F

2011–12 INCH All-Americans
Brian Dumoulin, D

2011–12 INCH Freshman All-Americans
Johnny Gaudreau, F

2011–12 New England Men's Division I All-Stars
Brian Dumoulin, D
Chris Kreider, F

2011–12 Bob Monahan Award – Best Defenseman in New England
Brian Dumoulin, D

2012 Beanpot MVP
Johnny Gaudreau, F

2012 Hockey East Tournament MVP
Johnny Gaudreau, F

2012 Hockey East All-Tournament Team
Parker Milner, G
Brian Dumoulin, D
Johnny Gaudreau, F

National Player of the Month
Parker Milner, G March/April 2012

National Rookie of the Month
Johnny Gaudreau, F March/April 2012

Hockey East Player of the Month
Bill Arnold, F – October 2011
Parker Milner, G – March 2011

Hockey East Goaltender of the Month
Parker Milner – February 2012

Hockey East Rookie of the Month
Johnny Gaudreau, F – October 2011, March 2011, February 2012

Hockey East Team of the Week
Week of October 10, 2011
Week of October 24, 2011
Week of February 20, 2012
Week of March 5, 2012
Week of March 26, 2012
Week of April 9, 2012

Hockey East Player of the Week
Bill Arnold, F – Week of October 24, 2011 (shared with Sebastian Stalberg, F, Vermont)
Chris Kreider, F – Week of January 30, 2012 (shared with Cody Ferriero, F, Northeastern)
Parker Milner, G – Week of March 26, 2012, Week of April 9, 2012

Hockey East Defensive Player of the Week
Brian Billett, G – Week of November 28, 2011
Parker Milner, G – Week of February 20, 2012, Week of February 27, 2012, Week of March 5, 2012 (shared with Dan Sullivan, G, Maine)
Patrick Wey, D – Week of March 26, 2012
Brian Dumoulin, D – Week of April 9, 2012

Hockey East Rookie of the Week
Johnny Gaudreau, F – Week of October 10, 2011, Week of October 31, 2011, Week of February 13,2012, Week of March 26, 2012, Week of April 9, 2012

2011–12 Hockey East Best Defensive Defenseman
Brian Dumoulin, D

2011–12 Hockey East Goaltending champion
Park Milner, 1.85 GAA, .928 Save %

2011–12 Hockey East First Team All-Stars
Brian Dumoulin, D
Barry Almeida, F

2011–12 Hockey East Second Team All-Stars
Chris Kreider, F

2011–12 Hockey East Honorable Mention All-Stars
Tommy Cross, D

2011–12 Hockey East All-Rookie Team
Johnny Gaudreau, F

2011–12 Hockey East All-Academic Team
Patrick Brown, F
Brooks Dyroff, F
Isaac Macleod, D
Pat Mullane, F
Michael Sit, F
Patrick Wey, D

Team Awards

Boston College Eagle of the Year
Tommy Cross (male recipient)

Norman F. Dailey Award (Team MVP)
Barry Almeida, F
Brian Dumoulin, D
Parker Milner, G

John "Snooks" Kelley Memorial Award (Best Typifies BC Hockey)
Tommy Cross, D
Paul Carey, F

William J. Flynn Coaches Award
Chris Venti, G
Samson Lee, manager

James E. Tiernan Award (Most Improved Player)
Chris Kreider, F

Bernie Burke Outstanding Freshman Award
Johnny Gaudreau, F

Academic Excellence Award
Tommy Cross, D

Academic Achievement Award
Edwin Shea, D

Players drafted into the NHL

2012 NHL Entry Draft

† incoming freshman

External links
BC Men's Hockey Home Page
BC Men's Hockey Page on USCHO

References

Boston College Eagles men's ice hockey seasons
Boston College Eagles
Boston College
Boston College
Boston College
Boston College Eagles men's ice hockey season
Boston College Eagles men's ice hockey season
Boston College Eagles men's ice hockey season
Boston College Eagles men's ice hockey season